Embrace the Storm is Stream of Passion's debut album released on October 24, 2005 by InsideOut Music. It was preceded by the single "Wherever You Are" (October 18, 2005) and was followed by the single "Out in the Real World" (February 27, 2006), both featured on this album.

The album was also released as a dual disc, including on the DVD side the entire album in 5.1 Dolby Surround, a documentary on the making of the album, the video clip of the song "Passion" and a photo gallery.

It is the only album with founder, guitarist, keyboardist and composer Arjen Anthony Lucassen, guitarist Lori Linstruth, and keyboardist Alejandro Millán.

Recording the album
The songs were transferred between band members via the internet.
Because of the different countries the band members lived in, the album was recorded all around the world: the main recording, mixing and producing took place at Arjen Anthony Lucassen personal studio, The Electric Castle in the Netherlands. The drums were recorded at Fendal Soundstudios (also in the Netherlands) by Hans van Vondelen. The vocals were recorded at The North Garden Records in Mexico by Alejandro Millán. The lead guitars was recorded at Träsmark Studios in Sweden. The album was mastered at Fine Tune by Peter van 't Riet.

Track listing
All music by Arjen Anthony Lucassen
All lyrics by Marcela Bovio

"Spellbound"  – 3:33
"Passion"  – 5:19
"Deceiver"  – 5:08
"I'll Keep on Dreaming"  – 3:44
"Haunted"  – 4:30
"Wherever You Are"  – 5:07
"Open Your Eyes"  – 5:13
"Embrace the Storm"  – 4:11
"Breathing Again"  – 3:37
"Out in the Real World"  – 4:31
"Nostalgia"  – 3:07
"Calliopeia"  – 5:38

Personnel

Band members
Marcela Bovio - lead and backing vocals, violin
Arjen Anthony Lucassen - guitars, keyboards
Lori Linstruth - lead guitars
Johan van Stratum - bass 
Alejandro Millán - piano
Davy Mickers - drums

Additional musicians
Robert Baba, Jenneke Tesselaar, Herrman van Haaren, Friedmar Hitzer - violins
Marieke van der Heyden, Tjakina Oosting, Jacqueline Hamelink - celli
Joost van den Broek - transcriptions for celli
Robert Baba - transcriptions for violins

Production
mixing, producing and main recording - Arjen Anthony Lucassen
mastering - Peter van 't Riet
photos - Edwin van Hoof (live pics), Alan Flores (Marcela pics), Lex Hulleman (videoclip stills), Stefan Schipper (band pics)
make-up - Lida van Straaten (band pics), Oscar Acosta (Marcela Pics).

2005 debut albums
Stream of Passion albums
Inside Out Music albums